Princess Myeongon (Hangul: 명온공주, Hanja: 明溫公主; 1810 - 1832) was a Joseon Dynasty princess, as the eldest daughter of King Sunjo and Queen Sunwon of the Andong Kim clan.

Biography
She was born in 1810, as the eldest daughter and second child of Sunjo of Joseon and Queen Sunwon of the Andong Kim clan.

On May 11, 1817, at the age of 8 years old, she was granted the title of Princess Myeongon (명온공주, 明溫公主).

On May 10, 1823, a selection to choose her husband took place nationwide. Only boys between 12 and 15 years old could participate and the winner was Kim Hyeon-geun (김현근), the son of Kim Han-sun (김한순) from the Andong Kim clan. They were married on July 20, that same year, and Kim was granted the title of Prince Consort Dongnyeong (동녕위).

The Princess died at the age of 21, in 1832, after a long struggle with illness.

Her tomb is located in San 84–2, Gyomun-dong, Guri-si, Gyeonggi-do alongside her husband, who died on 1868 (5th year of Emperor Gojong's reign).

Family
Father: Sunjo of Joseon (29 July 1790 - 13 December 1834) (조선 순조왕)
Grandfather: Jeongjo of Joseon (28 October 1752 - 18 August 1800) (조선 정조왕)
Grandmother: Royal Noble Consort Su of the Bannam Park clan (8 May 1770 - 26 December 1822) (수빈 박씨)
Mother: Queen Sunwon of the Andong Kim clan (8 June 1789 - 21 September 1857) (순원왕후 김씨)
Grandfather: Kim Jo-sun (1765 - 1832) (김조순)
Grandmother: Internal Princess Consort Cheongyang of the Cheongsong Shim clan (1766 - 1828) (청양부부인 청송 심씨)
Sibling(s):
Older brother: Yi Yeong, Crown Prince Hyomyeong (18 September 1809 - 25 June 1830) (이영 효명세자)
Sister-in-law: Crown Princess Jo of the Pungyang Jo clan (21 January 1809 - 4 June 1890) (세자빈 조씨)
Nephew: Heonjong of Joseon (8 September 1827 - 25 July 1849) (조선 헌종왕)
Niece-in-law: Queen Hyohyeon of the Andong Kim clan (27 April 1828 - 18 October 1843) (효현왕후 김씨)
Niece-in-law: Queen Hyojeong of the Namyang Hong clan (6 March 1831 - 2 January 1904) (효정왕후 홍씨)
Younger sister: Princess Bokon (26 October 1818 - 12 May 1832) (복온공주)
Brother-in-law: Kim Byeong-ju, Prince Consort Changnyeong (1819 - 1853) (김병주 창녕위)
Younger sister: Princess Deokon (10 June 1822 - 24 May 1844) (덕온공주)
Brother-in-law: Yun Ui-seong, Prince Consort Namnyeong (? - 1887) (윤의선 남녕위)
 Niece: Lady Yun (윤씨, 尹氏)
Adoptive nephew: Yun Yong-gu (윤용구) (1853 - 1939)
Consort: 
Kim Hyeong-geun, Prince Consort Dongnyeong (1810 - 1868) (김현근 동녕위, 金賢根 東寧尉)
Father-in-law: Kim Han-sun (김한순, 金漢淳)
Grandfather-in-law: Kim Yi-yang (1755 - 1845) (김이양, 金履陽)
Mother-in-law: Lady Shin of the Pyeongsan Shin clan (평산 신씨)
Grandfather-in-law: Shin Ui (신의, 申懿)
Issue:
Daughter: Lady Kim (김씨, 金氏)
Adoptive son: Kim Byeon-chan (김병찬, 金炳瓚)

In popular culture
 Portrayed by Jung Hye-sung in the 2016 KBS2 TV series Love in the Moonlight.

References

1810 births
1832 deaths
Princesses of Joseon
19th-century Korean people
19th-century Korean women